Al-Quds College in Jordan was established in 1983 and is part of Luminus Education Group. Al Quds College is a private community college offering vocational two year diploma programs in six areas. All of its programs are accredited by the Ministry of Higher Education and Scientific Research through Al Balqa University. To date, over 25,000 students have graduated from Al Quds College.
The current student population of the college is approximately 2,500 students. Luminus Education is in talks with global education partners to strengthen Al Quds College's programs and provide faculty and certification programs that are developed in cooperation with the industry in Jordan, raising the level of training to Best International Standards.
Al Quds also provides locally accredited career development programs (4–9 months) to individuals who have not graduated from high school or who are looking for a career change. All of its trainers/facilitators come from the industry and offer both theoretical and practical expertise. After course completion trainees have the option to sit for international examinations at the Pro-metric Testing Center to receive their passing certificates.

Diploma programs
Medical Assistance
Engineering Studies
Financial Studies
Administrative Studies
Information Technology
Applied Arts
Hotel Management
Tourism
Sales and Management
Retail Management
Human Resources Management
Office Systems Management
Programs are certified by the Ministry of Higher Education through Al-Balqa university.

Training center
Established in 1999, Arcana provides internationally certified Management and IT training programs to corporations and government organizations. Arcana is also an authorized Pro-metric Testing Center.

International projects
Al Quds College is working on several projects. Some are funded and supported by the United States Agency for International Development through Higher Education for Development including two different projects with two different states, Iowa and Michigan.

Economic Empowerment through Entrepreneurship
Al Quds College works with Eastern Iowa Community Colleges in Iowa to develop entrepreneurship training for career and technical training for students in order to exchange knowledge and extend students' experiences through exchange visits that includes students and Faculty. Partners are developing and implementing an entrepreneurship across the curriculum program for career and technical education students and a modularized entrepreneurship certificate program for existing small and medium-sized businesses.

Community Colleges Entrepreneurship Integration To Incubation
Community College Entrepreneurship Integration to Incubation: Al Quds College with Washtenaw Community College and William Davidson Institute at the University of Michigan established a Business Incubator at Al Quds premises in order to help the local community and Al Quds College students to start-up their own business right from the college and prior to graduation. The incubator tenants are selected after going through a simple process that includes taking the Build Your Business (BYB) course, participating in the quick pitch competition and presenting the Business Model Canvas, the best tenants will be selected and incubated. Al Quds Business Incubator offers different services including: mentoring, training, roundtable discussions and connections with organisations from both the private and public sector.

Photo gallery

References

Universities and colleges in Jordan
Education in Amman